Delta Ursae Majoris (δ Ursae Majoris, abbreviated Delta UMa, δ UMa), formally named Megrez , is a star in the northern constellation of Ursa Major. With an apparent magnitude of +3.3, it is the dimmest of the seven stars in the Big Dipper asterism.

Stellar properties

Delta Ursae Majoris has 63% more mass than the Sun and is about 1.4 times its radius. It has a stellar classification of A3 V, which means it is an A-type main sequence star that is generating energy at its core through the nuclear fusion of hydrogen. It shines at 14 times the luminosity of the Sun, with this energy being emitted from its outer envelope at an effective temperature of 9,480 K. This gives it the white hue typical of an A-type star.

This star has an excess emission of infrared radiation, indicating the presence of circumstellar matter. This forms a debris disk around an orbital radius of 16 astronomical units from the star. This radius is unusually small for the estimated age of the disk, which may be explained by drag from the Poynting–Robertson effect causing the dust to spiral inward.

It has two faint companions, a 10th magnitude star and an 11th magnitude star, both at an angular separation of two arcminutes from the primary.

Delta Ursae Majoris is a member of the Ursa Major moving group, an association of stars that share a common motion through space and likely formed in the same molecular cloud. The space velocity components of Delta Ursae Majoris in the galactic coordinate system are [U, V, W] = [+15.35, +1.17, –11.52].

Nomenclature

δ Ursae Majoris (Latinised to Delta Ursae Majoris) is the star's Bayer designation.

It bore the traditional name Megrez  and the historical name Kaffa. Megrez comes from the  al-maghriz 'the base [of the bear's tail]'. Professor Paul Kunitzch has been unable to find any clues as to the origin of the name Kaffa, which appeared in a 1951 publication, Atlas Coeli (Skalnate Pleso Atlas of the Heavens) by Czech astronomer Antonín Bečvář.

The Hindus knew this star as Atri, one of the Seven Rishis.

Namesakes
USS Megrez (AK-126) was a United States Navy Crater class cargo ship named after the star.

References

A-type main-sequence stars
Triple star systems
Ursa Major Moving Group

Megrez
Ursae Majoris, Delta
Big Dipper
Ursa Major (constellation)
Durchmusterung objects
Ursae Majoris, 69
106591
059774
4660